The Drosophila funebris species group is a species group of fruit flies in the subgenus Drosophila.

References 

Insect species groups
funebris